Magdalena Catherine, Countess Palatine of Zweibrücken (26 April 1607, Zweibrücken – 20 January 1648, Strasbourg) was a Countess Palatine of Zweibrücken by birth and by marriage Duchess and Countess Palatine of Birkenfeld.

Life
Magdalena Catherine was the only child of the Duke and Count Palatine John II of Zweibrücken-Veldenz (1584–1635) from his first marriage to Catherine de Rohan (1578–1607), daughter of René II, de Rohan.  From the second marriage of his father, she had seven half-siblings, of whom the oldest half-brother, Frederick inherited their father's position as Count Palatine and Duke of Zweibrücken.

She married on 14 November 1630 in Zweibrücken Count Palatine and Duke Christian I of Birkenfeld (1598–1654).  Magdalena Catherine brought as a dowry to her husband the district of Bischweiler in Alsace into the marriage. The couple initially lived in a wing of Birkenfeld Castle. Later Christian built a castle of his own, which they used as a family residence.  Bischweiler was completely destroyed in 1635 in the throes of the Thirty Years' War.

Magdalena Catherine died in exile in Strasbourg on 20 January 1648.  She was buried in the Reformed Church of Bischweiler.

Offspring
From her marriage, Katharina Magdalena had the following children:
 Unnamed Son (* / † 1631)
 Gustav Adolph (* / † 1632)
 John Christian * (* / † 1633)
 Dorothea Catherine (1634–1715)
 married in 1649 Count John Louis of Nassau-Ottweiler (1625–1690)
 Louise Sophie (1635–1691)
 Christian II (1637–1717), Duke and Count Palatine of Birkenfeld
 married in 1667 Countess Catherine Agathe of Rappoltstein (1648–1683)
 John Charles (1638–1704), Count Palatine and Duke of Gelnhausen
 married firstly, in 1685 Princess and Countess Palatine Sophie Amalie of Zweibrücken (1646–1695)
 married secondly, in 1696 Esther Marie of Witzleben (1665–1725)
 Anna Magdalena (1640–1693)
 married in 1659 Count Johann Reinhard II of Hanau-Lichtenberg (1628–1666)

References
 Annelise Stemper: Die Medaillen der Pfalzgrafen und Kurfürsten bei Rhein: pfälzische Geschichte im Spiegel der Medaille, Band 1, Wernersche, 1997, p. 845

Footnotes

1607 births
1648 deaths
17th-century German people
17th-century German women
Countesses Palatine of Zweibrücken
German duchesses
House of Wittelsbach
Daughters of monarchs